is a member of the all-female manga-creating team Clamp. Her duties in the team are Nanase Ohkawa's sounding board, and the character designer of Chobits and line artist for Tsubasa: Reservoir Chronicle.

Her cousin is fellow manga artist, Yumiko Igarashi.

According to Clamp's The One I Love, Satsuki was bullied as a child in kindergarten by a group of boys. However, there was one boy who always stood up for her, and Satsuki developed a crush on him.

References

External links
 Solomon, Charles. "Four Mothers of Manga Gain American Fans With Expertise in a Variety of Visual Styles". The New York Times. November 28, 2006. Retrieved March 2, 2010.

Living people
Clamp (manga artists)
1969 births